Andrea Fedi (born 29 May 1991) is an Italian former racing cyclist, who rode professionally between 2013 and 2017 for the  and  teams.

Major results

2009
 3rd Road race, National Junior Road Championships
2011
 1st Trofeo Nesti e Nelli
 1st Coppa 29 Martiri di Figline di Prato
 2nd Trofeo Frasconi Fosco
 3rd Road race, National Under-23 Road Championships
 3rd La Popolarissima
 5th GP Industria del Cuoio e delle Pelli
2012
 1st Trofeo Tosco-Umbro
 1st Coppa Città di San Daniele
 2nd Coppa Fiera Mercatale
 2nd Gran Premio della Liberazione
 2nd Coppa 29 Martiri di Figline di Prato
 3rd Memorial Angelo Fumagalli
 3rd Ruota d'Oro
 4th Giro del Belvedere
 6th Trofeo Gianfranco Bianchin
2013
 1st Stage 3 Okolo Slovenska
 2nd Trofeo Città di Castelfidardo
 5th GP Industria & Artigianato di Larciano
 9th Grand Prix Südkärnten
 10th Raiffeisen Grand Prix
2014
 2nd GP Ouest–France
 5th Coppa Ugo Agostoni
 6th Dwars door Drenthe
 8th GP Industria & Artigianato di Larciano
2015
 2nd Giro dell'Emilia
 5th Coppa Sabatini
 7th Brussels Cycling Classic
 9th Gran Piemonte
2016
 1st Trofeo Laigueglia
 2nd GP Industria & Artigianato di Larciano
 4th Gran Premio della Costa Etruschi
 7th Coppa Ugo Agostoni

References

External links
 

1991 births
Living people
Italian male cyclists
People from Prato
Sportspeople from the Province of Prato
Cyclists from Tuscany